The pound (symbol £) was the currency of the breakaway Republic of Biafra between 1968 and 1970.

The first notes, in denominations of 5/– and £1, were introduced on January 29, 1968. A series of coins was issued in 1969; 3d, 6d, 1/–, and 2/6 coins were minted, all struck in aluminium. In February 1969, a second family of notes was issued in denominations of 5/– and 10/–, £1, £5 and £10. Despite not being recognised currency by the rest of the world when issued, the banknotes were afterwards sold as curios (typically at an eighth of their face value: 2/6 (=£0.125sterling) for Biafran £1 notes when sold in British notaphily shops), and are now traded among banknote collectors at well above their original nominal value.

The most commonly found notes are the 1968 and 1969 £1 notes, with the £10 note and all coins being rare.

See also

 Nigerian pound
 Nigerian naira
Postage stamps and postal history of Biafra

References

External links
 Banknotes of Biafra. 
Coins with Nigerian naira
Information from Biafraland.
A detailed article on the banknotes of the Biafran pound pjsymes.com.au
Biafra: Coins Issued and Used Online Coin Club

Pound (currency)
Modern obsolete currencies
Currencies of the Commonwealth of Nations
Currencies of Nigeria
Biafra
1967 establishments in Nigeria
1970 disestablishments
Economy of Nigeria